Robert Trösch (25 November 1911 – 14 January 1986) was a Swiss actor.

Selected filmography
 Jä-soo! (1935)
 Bortsy (1936)
 Fusilier Wipf (1938)
 Constable Studer (1939)
 Wilder Urlaub (1943)
 Saure Wochen - frohe Feste (1950)
 Ernst Thälmann (1954)
 Nelken in Aspik (1976)

External links

1911 births
1986 deaths
Swiss male film actors
Male actors from Zürich
20th-century Swiss male actors